Cheshmeh Dozdak-e Olya (also Romanized as Cheshmeh Dozdak-e ‘Olyā; also known as Cheshmeh Dozdak and Cheshmeh Dozdak-e Bālā) is a village in Chenar Rural District, Kabgian District, Dana County, Kohgiluyeh and Boyer-Ahmad Province, Iran. At the 2006 census, its population was 55, in 14 families.

References 

Populated places in Dana County